Inna Gest (1921–1964) was a Ukrainian-born film actress. In Hollywood she played the female lead in several films, mainly westerns.  Increasingly cast in smaller parts she retired from acting after 1948.

Selected filmography
 Fast and Furious (1939)
 What a Life (1939)
 Boys of the City (1940)
 The Golden Trail (1940)
 Gun Code (1940)
 Hard Guy (1941)
 Six Gun Gospel (1943)
 You Can't Beat the Law (1943)
 Ladies of Washington (1944)
 No Minor Vices (1948)

References

Bibliography
 Dixon, Wheeler. Producers Releasing Corporation: A Comprehensive Filmography and History. McFarland, 1986.
 Pitts, Michael R. Western Film Series of the Sound Era. McFarland, 2009.

External links

1921 births
1964 deaths
American film actresses
Ukrainian film actresses
Ukrainian SSR emigrants to the United States
People from Odesa